The 135th Street station is a local station on the IND Eighth Avenue Line of the New York City Subway. Located at the intersection of 135th Street and St. Nicholas Avenue in Harlem and Hamilton Heights in Manhattan, it is served by the B on weekdays, the C train at all times except nights, and the A train during late nights only.

History
The station opened on September 10, 1932, as part of the city-operated Independent Subway System (IND)'s initial segment, the Eighth Avenue Line between Chambers Street and 207th Street. While the IRT Broadway–Seventh Avenue Line already provided parallel service, the new Eighth Avenue subway via Central Park West and Frederick Douglass Boulevard provided an alternative route.

Station layout

There is no trim line at this station, but there are mosaic name tablets reading "135TH ST." in white sans-serif lettering on a Prussian green background and black border. Small tile captions reading "135" run along the wall at regular intervals between the name tablets, and under the name tablets are directional captions, all in white lettering on a black background. Hunter green I-beam columns run along the platforms at regular intervals, alternating ones having the standard black station name plate with white lettering.

This station is the only local station with six tracks between two side platforms and is one of only three stations in the entire subway system that features six tracks on the same level, within the same tunnel (the others are DeKalb Avenue and Hoyt–Schermerhorn Streets, both in Downtown Brooklyn). The two outermost tracks are used by local trains stopping at this station, while the two innermost tracks are used by express trains. The middle tracks in each direction are lay-up tracks and not used in revenue service. All fare controls are at platform level and there are no mezzanines, crossovers, or crossunders.

This station is located close to the nearby City College of New York.

Exits
The full-time booths are at the 135th Street end. The booth at the 137th Street exit has been removed, and the 137th Street exits used to be part-time only. There were restrooms at the 137th Street end of the southbound platform. Both street staircases at this end were built with their entry points facing St. Nicholas Park and have an old-fashioned appearance.

From the southern end of the station, there is a staircase on the west side of St. Nicholas Avenue at West 135th Street to the southbound platform, within St. Nicholas Park, a staircase from the northeastern corner of St. Nicholas Avenue and West 135th Street to the northbound platform, and two staircases to the northbound platform from the southeastern corner of St. Nicholas Avenue and West 135th Street. At the northern end of the station, there is a staircase leading to the southbound platform from the western side of St. Nicholas Avenue at West 137th Street, within St. Nicholas Park, and an exit-only staircase from the northbound platform leading to the southeastern corner of St. Nicholas Avenue and West 137th Street. This exit features an array of stone casting in a Cathedral-like setting, originally built in 1932.

References

External links 

 
 Station Reporter — B Train
 Station Reporter — C Train
 The Subway Nut — 135th Street Pictures 
 Edgecombe Avenue, 135th Street, and Saint Nicholas Avenue entrances from Google Maps Street View
 135th Street entrance in park from Google Maps Street View
 137th Street stone entrance from Google Maps Street View
 137th Street entrance in park from Google Maps Street View
 Platform from Google Maps Street View

IND Eighth Avenue Line stations
New York City Subway stations in Manhattan
Railway stations in the United States opened in 1932
1932 establishments in New York City
Hamilton Heights, Manhattan